Pirthīpur or Pirthipur is an inhabited place in the state of Madhya Pradesh, India.

References
Pirthīpur at GeoNet names server

Cities and towns in Niwari district